Territorial Assembly elections were held in French Upper Volta on 30 March 1952. The result was a victory for the Voltaic Union (UV).

Electoral system
The Territorial Assembly had 50 seats, with 10 elected by the First College (French citizens) and 40 by the Second College (non-French citizens).

Results

References

Upper Volta
1952 in French Upper Volta
Elections in Burkina Faso
Election and referendum articles with incomplete results
March 1952 events in Africa